Austin Cook "Prex" Merrill (January 15, 1884 – February 23, 1935) was an American football coach.  Merrill was the head football coach at Alderson–Broaddus College in Philippi, West Virginia. He held that position for the 1910 season.   His coaching record at Alderson–Broaddus was 1–3. Merrill also coached at Bethany College in West Virginia. He later worked as a lawyer.

Merrill attended West Virginia University, graduating in law in 1912 as well as Yale University, where he received his A.B.  He was a member of the Phi Kappa Psi and Theta Nu Epsilon fraternities while at WVU.

Merrill died of a heart attack due to coronary thrombosis in 1935. At the time of his death, Merrill was serving as a Clerk for the U.S. District Court for Northern West Virginia.

References

1884 births
1935 deaths
Alderson Broaddus Battlers football coaches
West Virginia Mountaineers football players
Colgate University alumni
West Virginia University College of Law alumni
Yale Law School alumni
People from Carthage, New York
People from De Kalb, New York
Players of American football from New York (state)
West Virginia lawyers
Deaths from coronary thrombosis
20th-century American lawyers